Stephan Patrick Veen (born 27 July 1970, in Groningen) is a retired field hockey forward and midfielder from The Netherlands, who twice became olympic champion with the Dutch national squad: in 1996 and in 2000.

External links
 
 Dutch Hockey Federation

1970 births
Living people
Dutch male field hockey players
Olympic field hockey players of the Netherlands
Field hockey players at the 1992 Summer Olympics
Field hockey players at the 1996 Summer Olympics
1998 Men's Hockey World Cup players
Field hockey players at the 2000 Summer Olympics
Olympic medalists in field hockey
Sportspeople from Groningen (city)
Medalists at the 2000 Summer Olympics
Medalists at the 1996 Summer Olympics
Olympic gold medalists for the Netherlands
HGC players
1990 Men's Hockey World Cup players